Kol is a Niger–Congo language of the Bantu family, associated with the Bikélé ethnic group. It is spoken in the East Province of Cameroon, in the vicinity of Messaména. Alternate names for Kol language include Bikele-Bikay, Bikele-Bikeng, Bikélé, and Bekol.

Demographics
Kol, also known as Bekol or Bikele, is located in the northern part of Messamena, Haut-Nyong Department (Eastern Region), south of Meka. It is closely related to Meka and has 12,000 speakers (Ethnologue 2000).

References

Further reading
 Henson, Bonnie Jean. 2007. The phonology and morphosyntax of Kol. Ph.D., University of California, Berkeley. xx, 592 p.

Languages of Cameroon
Makaa-Njem languages